Apathya is a genus of lizards of the family Lacertidae.

Species
 Apathya cappadocica (Werner, 1902) - Anatolian lizard
 Apathya yassujica (Nilson, Rastegar-Pouyani, Rastegar-Pouyani & Andrén, 2003) - Yassujian lizard

References

 
Lizard genera
Taxa named by Lajos Méhelÿ